The Christian Health Association of Ghana (CHAG) is the umbrella organization that coordinates the activities of the Christian Health Institutions and Christian Churches’ Health programmes in Ghana.

Functions of CHAG
The main functions of CHAG are aimed at:
 serving the health needs of the poor and vulnerable populations that have been created by urbanisation.
 playing a complementary role to the Ministry of Health (MOH) and the Ghana Health Service (GHS)

Membership
CHAG’s 183 Member Institutions are predominantly located in the rural (underserved) areas.

References

External links
 Christian Health Association of Ghana (CHAG)
 Ghana Health Service homepage

Medical and health organisations based in Ghana